Pampisford railway station is a former British railway station in Pampisford, Cambridgeshire. It was on the Stour Valley Railway from 1865 to its closure in 1967.

References

External links
 Pampisford station on navigable 1946 O. S. map

Disused railway stations in Cambridgeshire
Beeching closures in England
Former Great Eastern Railway stations
Railway stations in Great Britain opened in 1865
Railway stations in Great Britain closed in 1967